Cain is an Italian black/thrash metal band formed and based in Rome. In 2007, their first studio album, Triumvira, was released through Vampyria Records. It was well received by the critics; Italian webzine TrueMetal.it awarded it a 79 out of 100. However, the band entered a long hiatus after the album's release, and were allegedly looking for a new record label during this period.

On 1 December 2014, Nunziati announced on his official Facebook page that Cain would be returning to active after a 7-year hiatus, and on 4 December, he stated that Francesco Bucci, famous for being the bassist of symphonic black metal band Stormlord, would be joining Cain.

Discography
 2005: Dioscuri Aurea Sæcula (demo)
 2007: Triumvira

Band members

Current members
 Lord Alexander (Alessandro Nunziati) – guitars, vocals (2005–present)

Past members
 Nighthorn (Silvano Leone) – bass (2005–2014)
 S.K. – drums (2005–2014)

References

External links
 Cain on Myspace

Musical groups from Rome
Italian black metal musical groups
Italian thrash metal musical groups
Musical groups established in 2005
2005 establishments in Italy